Itumeleng Issac Khune (born 20 June 1987) is a South African professional soccer player who plays as goalkeeper for Kaizer Chiefs in the Premier Soccer League, and also the South African national team and also works as plumber part time.  

He is the captain of both. Khune shot to fame when he saved three penalties from Esrom Nyandoro and Peter Ndlovu against Mamelodi Sundowns in the Telkom Knockout final on 1 December 2007. He is also well known for saving a David Villa penalty and proceeding to make a double save in the 2009 FIFA Confederations Cup group stage match against Spain a day before his 22nd birthday on 20 June 2009. On 16 June 2010 against Uruguay, Khune became the second goalkeeper in the history of the FIFA World Cup to be sent off. He is also famous for performing a René Higuita scorpion kick save in a league victory over Mpumalanga Black Aces on 28 October 2015. which made rounds in England. Khune is known for his quick reflexes and his distribution which has been hailed as "the best you will see anywhere" by former Liverpool goalkeeper Sander Westerveld.

Personal life
Khune was born in Tshing, Ventersdorp in the North West as one of six children of Elias and Flora Khune. He is of Tswana heritage. His father Elias, worked as a driver at a mine in Carletonville and also played amateur football as a striker. Unlike many South African players who cite kicking a football on their hometown's dusty streets as their starting point, Khune was in love with cricket idolising Nicky Boje. He eventually decided to pursue a career in football to earn a living for him and his family. He attended New Nation, Westridge, St Barnabas and RW Fick High Schools. His younger brother Lucky Khune previously played as a striker for Chiefs and currently for PSL side Chippa United. Khune is nicknamed "Spider-Man" for his reflexes and flexible goalkeeping skills. In 2019 Khune and his wife Sphelele Makhunga got married traditionally.

Club career
Khune started out as a striker when he arrived for trials at Chiefs in 1999, but assumed the gloves by chance after he experienced chest problems during a junior game and found himself being reduced to a ball boy. Diving for balls that had missed the target he caught the attention of youth coach Terror Sephoa who converted him to a goalkeeper. In 2004, he was promoted to the first team.

After three years of waiting to get any game time, Khune finally got his opportunity in the early stages of the 2007–08 season after the departure of number one goalkeeper Rowen Fernandez to German club Arminia Bielefeld. With the experienced Emile Baron often plagued by injuries, Khune was made number one by then Chiefs coach Muhsin Ertugral. He made his PSL debut against Jomo Cosmos on 25 August 2007. His first season in the top-flight was highly successful as several match-winning displays for his side earned him a host of individual awards with Chiefs having the best defensive record in the league conceding only 19 goals in 30 games.

In his second season, he often struggled to regain the form and consistency of the previous season even though Chiefs managed to finish third in the standings and win the MTN 8.

During the 2009–10 season a finger injury sidelined Khune for three months giving understudy Arthur Bartman a chance to play regularly in his absence.

In October 2011, Khune was assigned as captain replacing Jimmy Tau. The 2012–13 season was arguably his best with Khune leading his side to a league and cup double. He was also voted into Goal.com's Goal50 which is a list of the best players of 2013. He was ranked 45th ahead of Fernandinho, Robbie Keane, and Frank Lampard and behind Andrea Pirlo, Roman Weidenfeller, Victor Wanyama and James Rodríguez who were all ranked from 40 to 50. He made his 200th appearance for Chiefs against Mpumalanga Black Aces in 2014. Prior to that match he had 91 clean sheets in 199 games and at the beginning of the season, he had played 172 games for Chiefs. In the 2013–14 season he won the Goalkeeper of the Year award for the second time in a row with 15 goals conceded and 18 clean sheets in 25 starts beating Moeneeb Josephs and Anssi Jakkola. Around July 2014 he was linked to a move to Bundesliga club Hannover 96. On 3 September 2014, Khune was diagnosed with a Grade 3 stress fracture which he initially suffered from since February 2014. His injury cost him his place in the 2015 African Cup of Nations. He was declared fit to play on 23 February 2015 although he did suffer a minor injury after clashing Morgan Gould's studs to his ribs which left a mark in a 4–0 win over Edu Sports in the Nedbank Cup. On 9 April 2015 in a 1–0 win over AmaZulu, Khune was controversially sent off in the 82nd minute in a game which also produced nine yellow cards – after receiving two cautions in quick succession from referee Phillip Tinyane at Peter Mokaba Stadium. Khune was first booked for time-wasting before being given his marching orders for showing dissent at the decision. Khune took to Twitter saying: "@OfficialPSL I did nothing wrong. You guys need to take action against these poor referees. "It's about time action is taken against these referees by @OfficialPSL. They've been very poor since beginning of the season. It's unfair how we are painted bad for our actions on the field but we are provoked by these referees, [you] can call me names but I stand for what is right." The league then afforded Khune five days to explain his comments although Khune did issue a public apology.

Khune initially did not renew his contract with Kaizer Chiefs when it expired in June 2015, however, after a long period of negotiations, he returned to the club on 30 July 2015, signing a new contract.

International career
He was part of Bafana Bafana's 2008 African Nations Cup squad but was not fielded until he made his international debut against Zimbabwe on 11 March 2008. He had since become the preferred choice in goal by then coach Joel Santana.

Khune was the first-choice goalkeeper in South Africa's squad at the 2009 FIFA Confederations Cup. He saved a penalty against Spanish star David Villa in the group stages.

Khune was selected for the 2010 FIFA World Cup as Carlos Alberto Parreira's first-choice goalkeeper and made some good saves in the opening match against Mexico. However, on 16 June 2010, he was sent off against Uruguay when he tripped striker Luis Suárez inside the penalty area in the 77th minute. He became the second goalkeeper to be sent off in the history of the FIFA World Cup, joining Gianluca Pagliuca who saw red in 1994. This was the first red card of his career. Khune subsequently missed South Africa's final group game against France, where Moeneeb Josephs deputised as Bafana Bafana won 2–1 to restore some pride as they became the first host nation to exit the tournament at the opening stage. After the World Cup, he regained his number one spot in the team and he has kept three consecutive clean sheets on international level.

Khune represented Bafana Bafana in the whole tournament of 2013 African Cup of Nations and he kept two clean sheets in a goalless draw against Cape Verde and 2–0 victory against Angola. He was assigned the captaincy in May 2013, taking over from Bongani Khumalo and captained Bafana during the 2014 CHAN in South Africa.

In 2016, Khune was selected as one of South Africa's overage players for the 2016 Summer Olympics. He arrived at the tournament as the player with the most international experience, alongside Nigeria's Mikel John Obi, with 75 national team caps to his name. He was instrumental in his nation's opening match draw against Brazil, making a number of saves from Brazil captain Neymar.

Style of play
FifaPlayerRatings.com rates Khune in the top 10 of the goalkeepers in FIFA 15 and 525th overall. Khune is described as a player with "higher than normal diving skills and reflexes, making him a skilled close-shot and free-kick stopper with elite kicking abilities and accurate goal kicks and punts, taking pressure off his defense and creating attacking opportunities for his offense. He is technically skilled with his weak foot as well, which will allow him to accurately clear the ball with either foot when under pressure."

Outside football
He donated R150 000 to an old age home in his hometown of Ventersdorp, North West. He was accompanied by Minister of Sports and Recreation, Fikile Mbalula, George Lebese and George Maluleka.

Honours

Club
Kaizer Chiefs
 Premier Soccer League (3): 2004–05, 2012–13, 2014–15
 ABSA Cup/Nedbank Cup (2): 2006, 2013, 2014
 Coca-Cola Cup/Telkom Knockout (4): 2004, 2007, 2009, 2010
 SAA Supa 8/MTN 8 (3): 2006, 2008, 2014,

Individual
 PSL Footballer of the Year 2012–13
 PSL Players' Player of the Season 2007–08, 2012–13
 PSL Club Rookie of the Year 2007–08
 SA Sports Awards Sportsman of the Year 2013
 SA Sports Awards Newcomer of the Year 2008
 Telkom Knockout Player of the Tournament 2007
 Telkom Knockout Goalkeeper of the Tournament 2007
 Premier Soccer League Goalkeeper of the Season 2007–08, 2012–13,2013–14
 Kaizer Chiefs Player of the Season 2007–08, 2012–13
 Kaizer Chiefs Player's Player of the Season 2007–08, 2012–13
 Nedbank Cup Player of the Tournament '''2013

See also

References

External links

1987 births
Living people
People from Ventersdorp
South African soccer players
Association football goalkeepers
South Africa international soccer players
2008 Africa Cup of Nations players
2009 FIFA Confederations Cup players
Kaizer Chiefs F.C. players
2010 FIFA World Cup players
2013 Africa Cup of Nations players
Footballers at the 2016 Summer Olympics
Olympic soccer players of South Africa
South African Premier Division players
South Africa A' international soccer players
2014 African Nations Championship players